Masjed Soleyman County is in Khuzestan province, Iran. The capital of the county is the city of Masjed Soleyman. At the 2006 census, the county's population was 167,226 in 33,484 households. The following census in 2011 counted 113,257 people in 26,804 households, by which time Andika District had been separated from the county to form Andika County. At the 2016 census, Masjed Soleyman County's population was 113,419 in 30,115 households.

Administrative divisions

The population history and structural changes of Masjed Soleyman County's administrative divisions over three consecutive censuses are shown in the following table. The latest census shows three districts, six rural districts, and two cities.

References

 

Counties of Khuzestan Province